Quettetot is a former commune in the Manche department in north-western France. On 1 January 2016, it was merged into the new commune of Bricquebec-en-Cotentin. The inhabitants are called Quettetotais.

See also
 Communes of the Manche department

References

Former communes of Manche